Tomás Corrigan (born 1990) is a Gaelic footballer who has played for Fermanagh GAA club Kinawley, Dublin GAA club St Oliver Plunketts and the Fermanagh county team.

He attended St Michael's College, Enniskillen, and then went onto study Law at Trinity College Dublin.

He was the fourth highest scorer in Championship 2016, making a higher scoring average than marquee forwards the like of Cillian O'Connor, Conor McManus and Michael Quinlivan.

Corrigan transferred from Kinawley to St Oliver Plunketts in Dublin.

He is a solicitor. The law firm Arthur Cox employed him in Dublin and then he went off travelling to Latin America and became fluent in Spanish. When he returned he moved to Arthur Cox's Belfast office. He did it at the end of 2018, booking a one-way ticket to Mexico City and heading on down to Argentina, after struggling to make the Fermanagh team that got to the 2018 Ulster Senior Football Championship final. After a 2020 season when much of Fermanagh's scoring fell to him (because Seán Quigley had taken the year out), Corrigan opted out of the 2021 season, with about 85 appearances to his name. He began working with Mason Hayes & Curran LLP in Dublin in July 2021.

Corrigan probably had his best season in a Fermanagh shirt the year Fermanagh reached the 2015 All-Ireland Senior Football Championship quarter-finals. It was against Westmeath that year when he announced himself on the big stage by leaving Gary Connaughton for dead.

He has been critical of The Sunday Game on several occasions. His father Dominic also played for and managed Fermanagh.

References

External links
 "1 minute with Tomas Corrigan" at Fermanagh GAA

1990 births
Living people
Fermanagh inter-county Gaelic footballers
People educated at St Michael's College, Enniskillen